Qaban Kandi (also Romanized as Qabān Kandī) is a village in Keshavarz Rural District, Keshavarz District, Shahin Dezh County, West Azerbaijan Province, Iran. 835 people, in 181 families, were living there as of the 2006 Census.

References 

Populated places in Shahin Dezh County